Gunnlaugur Jónsson (born 29 November 1974) is an Icelandic football manager who last managed Þróttur in the 1. deild karla.

In his early career he played for ÍA. After short spells with Motherwell, Kongsvinger and Örebro, he rejoined ÍA, and played there until 2005, except for a spell at KFC Uerdingen 05. He then played with KR before starting his managing career at Selfoss. At his first season, Selfoss were promoted to Úrvalsdeild. However, Gunnlaugur decided to switch teams, spending two seasons with Valur, as well as KA for another two seasons. Gunnlaugur managed HK in the 2013 season, before once again returning to ÍA, from 2013 to 2017. He then dropped down a division to manage Þróttur for the 2018 season.

He was capped 12 times for the Icelandic national team.

References

1970 births
Living people
Gunnlaugur Jonsson
Gunnlaugur Jonsson
Gunnlaugur Jonsson
Gunnlaugur Jonsson
Motherwell F.C. players
Kongsvinger IL Toppfotball players
KFC Uerdingen 05 players
Örebro SK players
Gunnlaugur Jonsson
Gunnlaugur Jonsson
Expatriate footballers in Scotland
Gunnlaugur Jonsson
Expatriate footballers in Norway
Gunnlaugur Jonsson
Expatriate footballers in Germany
Gunnlaugur Jonsson
Gunnlaugur Jonsson
Eliteserien players
Allsvenskan players
Expatriate footballers in Sweden
Gunnlaugur Jonsson
Gunnlaugur Jonsson
Gunnlaugur Jonsson
Gunnlaugur Jonsson
Gunnlaugur Jonsson
Association football defenders